The Egypt–Greece–Saudi Arabia 2030 FIFA World Cup bid is a joint bid to host the 2030 FIFA World Cup by Egypt, Greece, and Saudi Arabia. Saudi Arabia is expected to lead the effort. If successful, it would be the first FIFA World Cup hosted in countries that are part of three different football federations (AFC, CAF and UEFA) on three continents: Asia, Africa and Europe.

Background
In recent years, the three nations have developed strong political, economic, and military ties. The bid could be the culmination of the alliance between the three nations, and is expected to be officially announced a few weeks before the start of  the 2022 FIFA World Cup in Qatar. The three countries share extensive maritime borders: Egypt with Greece and Egypt with Saudi Arabia.

Potential venues

For the 2026 FIFA World Cup, it has been confirmed that stadiums must have a capacity of at least 40,000 for group round, second round, and quarter final matches, 60,000 for the semi-finals, and at least 80,000 for the Opening Match and Final. The rules for 2030 have not been announced.

Egypt

Greece

Saudi Arabia

Other potential venues 
  Damanhour Stadium (Damanhour) - 60 000
  30 June Stadium (Cairo) - 30 000
  Al Salam Stadium (Cairo) - 30 000
  Ismailia Stadium (Ismailia) - 30 000
  Suez Stadium (Suez) - 27 000
  Alexandria Stadium (Alexandria) - 20 000
  Agia Sophia Stadium (Athens) - 32 500
  Karaiskakis Stadium (Piraeus) - 32 115
  Kaftanzoglio Stadium (Thessaloniki) - 27 770
  Pankritio Stadium (Herakleion) - 26 240
  Pampeloponnisiako Stadium (Patras) - 23 588
  Kleanthis Vikelidis Stadium (Thessaloniki) - 22 800
  Panthessaliko Stadium (Volos) - 22 700

Concerns
Much like the 2022 FIFA World Cup, if this bid is selected, the tournament would most likely be moved to the winter due to the high summer temperatures of the location. There is also concern about Saudi Arabia using the tournament as part of a larger football sportswashing campaign, which has already seen the PIF take over Newcastle United, their hosting of the 2023 FIFA Club World Cup, and Cristiano Ronaldo being signed to Al Nassr FC in Riyadh. Saudi Arabia is also a member of the AFC, whose rotation would prevent member countries from hosting World Cup until 2034. The Greek Prime Minister Kyriakos Mitsotakis also came under fire from the opposition Syriza in 2023 after a rumored deal involving Saudi Arabia building new stadiums in both Greece and Egypt was revealed by Politico. There is also concern in Greece about paying for mega events and large sports infrastructure, as many still remember the 2004 Summer Olympics, which left many abandoned venues and was partially blamed for the country's debt crisis. Additionally, with FIFA cutting the Visit Saudi sponsorship deal in April 2023, there may be issues with whether or not FIFA would be willing to support the bid.

See also
Uruguay–Argentina–Chile–Paraguay 2030 FIFA World Cup bid
Spain–Portugal–Morocco 2030 FIFA World Cup bid
2030 FIFA World Cup
Egypt Vision 2030
Saudi Vision 2030
Egypt–Greece relations
Egypt–Saudi Arabia relations
Greece–Saudi Arabia relations

References

External links

2030 FIFA World Cup bids
Egypt at the FIFA World Cup
Greece at the FIFA World Cup
Saudi Arabia at the FIFA World Cup